Vellanur  is a village in the Annavasalrevenue block of Pudukkottai district, Tamil Nadu, India.

Demographics 

As per the 2001 census, Vellanur had a total population of 4825 with 2443 males and 2382 females. Out of the total population 2711    people were literate.

References

Villages in Pudukkottai district